The Moin Formation is a geologic formation in Costa Rica. It preserves fossils dating back to the Late Pliocene to Early Pleistocene period.

Fossil content 
 Cataetyx stringeri
 Engina moinensis

See also 
 List of fossiliferous stratigraphic units in Costa Rica

References

Bibliography

Further reading 
 S. D. Cairns. 1995. New records of azooxanthellate stony corals (Cnidaria: Scleractinia and Stylasteridae) from the Neogene of Panama and Costa Rica. Proceedings of the Biological Society of Washington 108(3):533-550

Geologic formations of Costa Rica
Neogene Costa Rica
Pleistocene Costa Rica
Paleontology in Costa Rica
Siltstone formations
Limestone formations
Sandstone formations
Shale formations
Reef deposits
Formations